Gioacchino Illiano (27 July 1935 – 6 February 2020) was an Italian Roman Catholic bishop.

Illiano was born in Italy and was ordained to the priesthood in 1961. He served as the bishop of the Roman Catholic Diocese of Nocera Inferiore-Sarno, Italy. from 1987 to 2011.

Notes

1935 births
2020 deaths
21st-century Italian Roman Catholic bishops
20th-century Italian Roman Catholic bishops